Henry Otto Reinnoldt was a member of the Wisconsin State Assembly.

Biography
Reinnoldt was born on August 23, 1865 in Sheboygan, Wisconsin. He attended the University of the Sciences and was in the retail drug business. He died at his home in Milwaukee, Wisconsin on December 22, 1941.

Career
Reinnoldt was elected to the Assembly in 1896. He was a Republican. In 1917, Reinnoldt also served in the Wisconsin State Senate.

References

Politicians from Sheboygan, Wisconsin
Businesspeople from Wisconsin
Republican Party Wisconsin state senators
Republican Party members of the Wisconsin State Assembly
University of the Sciences alumni
1865 births
1941 deaths